Joseph J. Sullivan was a blackface comedian and acrobat in New York.  He composed the song Where Did You Get That Hat? and first performed it in 1888.  It was a great success and he performed it many times thereafter.

References

External links

Vaudeville performers
19th-century American people 
American entertainers